Zachary Daniel Weiss (born June 16, 1992) is an American-Israeli professional baseball pitcher for the Los Angeles Angels of Major League Baseball (MLB). He has previously played in MLB for the Cincinnati Reds. He has four pitches; he mostly throws his 93-95 mph fastball and a slider, and also throws a curveball and a changeup.

Weiss was a 2015 Southern League All Star, and a 2015 MILB.com Cincinnati Organization All Star, after a season in which his 30 saves were second-most in the minor leagues. The Cincinnati Reds added Weiss to their active roster for Opening Day 2018, and he made his major league debut that year.

In 2018, he became a dual Israeli citizen. He pitched for Team Israel at the 2019 European Baseball Championship. He also pitched for the team at the Africa/Europe 2020 Olympic Qualification tournament in Italy in September 2019, which Israel won to qualify to play baseball at the 2020 Summer Olympics in Tokyo.  He pitched for Team Israel at the 2020 Summer Olympics in Tokyo in the summer of 2021, and won its game against Mexico.  He will pitch for Team Israel in the 2023 World Baseball Classic in Miami, in March 2023.

Early and personal life
Weiss was born in Irvine, California, to Ernest and Nancy Weiss, and is Jewish. He was bar mitzvahed at Congregation B’nai Israel in Tustin, California.  In October 2018 he became a dual Israeli citizen, partly to help Israel's baseball team make the 2020 Olympics.

He has a younger sister, Ariana.

Weiss played baseball for Northwood High School in Irvine, where as a senior he was second-team All-California Interscholastic Federation Southern Section Division II and second-team All-Sea View League. Academically, he had a 4.0 GPA.

He was drafted by the Pittsburgh Pirates in the 10th round of the 2010 Major League Baseball Draft. He did not sign, and instead attended the University of California, Los Angeles (UCLA) to major in geography and environmental studies and play college baseball for the UCLA Bruins baseball team. In 2011, he played collegiate summer baseball in the Cape Cod Baseball League for the Yarmouth-Dennis Red Sox. In his junior year of college in 2013, he switched from being a starter to pitching as a reliever, had a 2.25 earned run average, and helped the Bruins win their first national baseball championship. He was a 2013 Jewish Sports Review Division I College Baseball All-American, along with Alex Bregman and Brad Goldberg.

Professional career

Cincinnati Reds
He was then drafted by the Cincinnati Reds in the sixth round of the 2013 MLB Draft. Weiss signed with the Reds and made his professional debut with the Arizona League Reds, and also played for the Billings Mustangs that year. Weiss spent 2014 with the Dayton Dragons of the Class A Midwest League, for whom he was 2-4 with a 2.42 ERA, with 80 strikeouts in 63.1 innings.

Weiss spent 2015 with the Daytona Tortugas of the Class A-Advanced Florida State League and the Pensacola Blue Wahoos of the Class AA Southern League. He had a Pensacola-record 25 saves (leading the league; in 27 opportunities; 11.8 K/9, 2.5 BB/9), and 30 saves (second in the minor leagues; in 32 opportunities) in total between the two teams. In 63 2/3 innings, he had a 1.98 ERA and gave up 42 hits and 15 walks, while striking out 90 batters (averaging 12.7 strikeouts per nine innings). He was a 2015 Southern League All Star, and a 2015 MILB.com Cincinnati Organization All Star. After the season, he played in the Arizona Fall League. He suffered an elbow injury in early 2016 while in major league spring training, did not pitch that year, and underwent surgery to transpose the ulnar nerve and to remove scar tissue in his pitching elbow in December 2016.

In 2017, Weiss was 2-1 with one save and a 2.08 ERA, and 19 strikeouts in 13 innings, for Daytona, and 2-4 with nine saves (tied for 7th in the league) and a 2.89 ERA, and 37 strikeouts in 28 innings, for Pensacola. Between the two teams, he averaged 12.3 strikeouts per nine innings.  The Reds added him to their 40-man roster after the 2017 season. In 2018 in the minors, between the Arizona Reds, Pensacola Blue Wahoos, and the Louisville Bats he was 3-3 with one save and a 5.40 ERA, and 26 strikeouts in 24.1 innings.

Reds manager Bryan Price said in spring training in 2018: "if he doesn't make the team I imagine we'll see him at some point during the year." The Cincinnati Reds added Weiss to their active roster on their Opening Day, March 30, 2018, and he made his major league debut on April 12, at Great American Ball Park against the St. Louis Cardinals.    He gave up two walks and two home runs to the 4 batters he faced.  Weiss was released by the Reds on September 1, 2018.

Minnesota Twins
On November 1, 2018, Weiss signed a minor league deal with the Minnesota Twins. He was released by the organization on July 15, 2019.

In 2019, pitching for the Class AA (the Pensacola Blue Wahoos) and Class AAA (the Rochester Red Wings) affiliates of the Minnesota Twins, he was a combined 1-3 with a 7.24 ERA in 16 relief appearances, with 30 strikeouts in 27.1 innings.

Long Island Ducks
On July 19, 2019, Weiss signed with the Long Island Ducks of the Atlantic League of Professional Baseball. Pitching for them in 2019 he was 4-1 with one save and a 4.68 ERA in 16 relief appearances, as he struck out 34 batters in 25 innings. He became a free agent following the season.

Cleveland Indians
On February 18, 2020, Weiss signed a minor league deal with the Cleveland Indians. Weiss was released by the Indians on May 29, 2020.

Sugar Land Skeeters
On August 4, 2020, Weiss signed with the Sugar Land Skeeters of the Constellation Energy League.

Kansas City Monarchs
On February 25, 2021, Weiss signed with the Kansas City Monarchs of the American Association of Professional Baseball. Weiss allowed 1 run in 2.0 innings of work in his only appearance for the Monarchs.

Seattle Mariners
On May 22, 2021, Weiss had his contract purchased by the Seattle Mariners organization. Pitching for the Tacoma Rainiers of the Triple-A West in 2021, he was 2-3 with one save and a 4.31 ERA. In 30 games (one start) he pitched 39.2 innings, striking out 56 batters (12.7 strikeouts per 9 innings).

Los Angeles Angels
On November 28, 2021, Weiss signed a minor league contract with the Los Angeles Angels. He began the 2022 season with the Class AAA Salt Lake Bees, with whom he was 2-3 with three saves and a 4.50 ERA in 45 relief appearances, covering 50 innings in which he had 65 strikeouts. He had his contract selected on September 1, 2022, and with the Angels was 0-1 with a 3.38 ERA in 12 relief appearances, as in 13.1 innings he gave up seven hits and struck out 18 batters (12.2 strikeouts/9 innings).

Team Israel; World Baseball Classic and Olympics
Weiss pitched for Team Israel at the 2019 European Baseball Championship, going 1-0 with one save and a 0.00 ERA as in four relief appearances he pitched 6.1 innings and gave up one hit (holding batters to a .050 batting average) and three walks while striking out five batters.  He also pitched for the team at the Africa/Europe 2020 Olympic Qualification tournament in Italy in September 2019, which Israel won to qualify to play baseball at the 2020 Summer Olympics in Tokyo. In the tournament he was 0-0 with a 6.00 ERA over 3.0 innings in which he gave up one hit, four walks, and had six strikeouts.

He pitched for Team Israel at the 2020 Summer Olympics in Tokyo in the summer of 2021, and won its game against Mexico. Overall, in three games Weiss pitched seven innings, gave up nine hits and seven earned runs, and struck out 11 batters.

Weiss will pitch for Team Israel in the 2023 World Baseball Classic, to be held in Miami starting during March 11–15. He will be playing for Team Israel manager Ian Kinsler, and alongside two-time All Star outfielder Joc Pederson, starting pitcher Dean Kremer, and others.

See also
List of select Jewish Major League Baseball players

References

External links

UCLA Bruins bio

1992 births
Living people
Sportspeople from Irvine, California
Baseball players from California
Jewish American baseball players
Jewish Major League Baseball players
Major League Baseball pitchers
Cincinnati Reds players
Los Angeles Angels players
UCLA Bruins baseball players
Yarmouth–Dennis Red Sox players
Arizona League Reds players
Billings Mustangs players
Dayton Dragons players
Daytona Tortugas players
Pensacola Blue Wahoos players
Peoria Javelinas players
Louisville Bats players
Tacoma Rainiers players
Long Island Ducks players
Israeli American
Israeli baseball players
2019 European Baseball Championship players
2023 World Baseball Classic players
Baseball players at the 2020 Summer Olympics
Olympic baseball players of Israel
21st-century American Jews